Saudi Arabia competed at the 1996 Summer Olympics in Atlanta, United States.

Results by event

Athletics
Men's 5,000 metres 
 Alyan al-Qahtani
 Qualification — did not start (→ did not advance)

Men's 10,000 metres 
 Alyan Al-Qahtani
 Qualification — did not finish (→ did not advance)

Men's 4 × 400 m Relay
Saleh al-Saydan, Mohammed al-Beshi, Hashim al-Sharfa, and Hadi Souan Somayli
 Heat — 3:04.67
 Semi Final — 3:07.18 (→ did not advance)

Men's 400m Hurdles
Hadi Souan Somayli
 Heat — 49.94s (→ did not advance)

Men's 3,000 metres Steeplechase
 Ibrahim Al-Asiri Yahya
 Heat — 8:46.37 (→ did not advance)

References
Official Olympic Reports

Nations at the 1996 Summer Olympics
1996
1996 in Saudi Arabian sport